Enezaide do Rosário da Vera Cruz Gomes OIH (born 20 November 1979) is a former Portuguese heptathlete and long jumper. She also competed in 100 metres hurdles at the 2000 Summer Olympics. At club level, she represented Sporting CP.

Biography
Naide Gomes started competing under the flag of her birth country São Tomé and Príncipe and represented it at the Sydney 2000 Olympics, though she has lived in Portugal since she was 11 years old. At the Sydney Olympics, Gomes was the São-Tomé flag carrier in the opening ceremony. Before changing nationality she set the current São Tomé and Príncipe records in 100 metres hurdles, long jump, high jump, triple jump, shot put, javelin throw and heptathlon.

She gained Portuguese citizenship in 2001, and has since represented Portugal at major international events.

Gomes has won the gold medal for long jump at the 2007 European Athletics Indoor Championships, raising the national record to 6.89 m.

In Madrid, she became the first Portuguese athlete ever to reach the seven metres distance in the long jump, by jumping 7.01m. In Valencia she won gold at the World Athletics Indoor Championships 2008, by jumping 7.00m.

On 22 July, Naide Gomes was the winner of the IAAF Super Grand Prix DN Galan, Stockholm, Sweden, with a new national record of 7.04 m.

On 29 July, at the IAAF Super Grand Prix Herculis, Monte-Carlo, Monaco, she jumped 7.12 m, a new national record and 2008 world's best mark.

On 19 August, at the 2008 Summer Olympics held in Beijing, China, a top-favorite for the gold medal, in peak physical condition and having dominated the season, Gomes unexpectedly fouled on her first two attempts and then stutter-stepped on her final try jumping a mere 6.29 m, thus failing to qualify to the final.

She won the long jump gold medal at the 2009 Lusophony Games with a jump of 6.74 m.

Achievements

Retirement

On 26 March 2015, Naide Gomes announced her retirement in a special news conference with close friends and the long term coach, at age 35. Main reasons appointed the prolonged injuries she is suffering since 2013, that took her away from the tracks, and the need of another surgery. She said to be very proud of her career, after winning 11 international medals, though failing at Olympic level, and wants to continue to be close to athletes, either as a coach or as physiotherapist. She also announced she's expecting her first child.

See also
List of eligibility transfers in athletics

Notes and references

1979 births
Living people
São Tomé and Príncipe long jumpers
Portuguese female long jumpers
Portuguese female hurdlers
Portuguese heptathletes
São Tomé and Príncipe female athletes
Athletes (track and field) at the 2000 Summer Olympics
Olympic athletes of São Tomé and Príncipe
Athletes (track and field) at the 2004 Summer Olympics
Olympic athletes of Portugal
Athletes (track and field) at the 2008 Summer Olympics
São Tomé and Príncipe emigrants to Portugal
European Athletics Championships medalists
Universiade medalists in athletics (track and field)
People from São Tomé
Universiade silver medalists for Portugal
Golden Globes (Portugal) winners
World Athletics Indoor Championships winners
Competitors at the 2003 Summer Universiade
Medalists at the 2005 Summer Universiade
Athletes (track and field) at the 1999 All-Africa Games
African Games competitors for São Tomé and Príncipe